Silvia Bruggmann (born 20 February 1978) is a Swiss ice hockey player. She competed in the women's tournament at the 2006 Winter Olympics.

References

External links
 

1978 births
Living people
Swiss women's ice hockey forwards
People from Toggenburg
Olympic ice hockey players of Switzerland
Ice hockey players at the 2006 Winter Olympics
Sportspeople from the canton of St. Gallen
20th-century Swiss women